High Mileage is the seventh studio album by American country music artist Alan Jackson. It was released on September 1, 1998 and produced four hit singles on the Hot Country Songs charts for Jackson: "I'll Go on Loving You" (#3), "Right on the Money" (#1), "Gone Crazy" (#4) and "Little Man" (#3). Upon its release in late 1998, "I'll Go on Loving You" became the highest-debuting single of Jackson's career at the time, entering the country charts at #35.

Also included here is the track "A Woman's Love", which Jackson re-recorded in 2006 for his album Like Red on a Rose. The re-recorded version on that album was released as a single in 2007, peaking at #5 that year.

Background
During the release of his 2000 album, When Somebody Loves You, Jackson reflected on the album on Arista's website:
" I guess the last album I made -- not the cover-song album, Under the Influence, but High Mileage was a little on the dark side. [Laughs] I love that album, but some of it's a little heavy. Of course, some of my life was a little dark at that time, and that's probably why it ended up that way. I guess this one reflects a little more of what I feel today. "

Track listing

Personnel
Alan Jackson - acoustic guitar, lead vocals
Bob Adcock - cello
Vage Ayrikyan - cello
Eddie Bayers - drums
Bob Becker - viola
Jodi Burnett - cello
Larry Corbett - cello
J. T. Corenflos - electric guitar
Bruce Dembow - viola
Steve Dorff - string arrangements, conductor
Bruce Dukov - violin
Stuart Duncan - fiddle, mandolin
Robbie Flint - steel guitar, silvertone
Larry Franklin - fiddle
Paul Franklin - steel guitar
Berj Garabedian - violin
Keith Greene - viola
Danny Groah - electric guitar
Alan Grunfeld - violin
Paula Hochhalter - cello
Pat Johnson - violin
Dennis Karmazyn - cello
Janet Lakatos - viola
Brent Mason - electric guitar
Monty Parkey - keyboards, piano
Katia Popov - violin
Rachel Purkin - violin
Hargus "Pig" Robbins - keyboards
Gil Romero - violin
Bruce Rutherford - drums, congas
Tom Rutledge - Dobro, acoustic guitar, mandolin
John Wesley Ryles - backing vocals
Sheldon Sanov - violin
John Scanlon - viola
Daniel Shindaryov - violin
Harry Shirinian - viola
Roman Volodarsky - violin
Bruce Watkins - acoustic guitar
Roger Wills - bass guitar
Glenn Worf - bass guitar

Charts
High Mileage peaked at #4 on the U.S. Billboard 200, and peaked at #1 on the Top Country Albums selling 97,000 copies, his fourth #1 Country album. In October 1998, High Mileage was certified platinum by the RIAA.

Weekly charts

Year-end charts

Sales and certifications

References

1998 albums
Alan Jackson albums
Arista Records albums
Albums produced by Keith Stegall